Thermus aquaticus is a species of bacteria that can tolerate high temperatures, one of several thermophilic bacteria that belong to the Deinococcota phylum.  It is the source of the heat-resistant enzyme Taq DNA polymerase, one of the most important enzymes in molecular biology because of its use in the polymerase chain reaction (PCR) DNA amplification technique.

History

Soon, however, it was discovered that many bacteria in different springs not only survived, but also thrived in higher temperatures. In 1969, Thomas D. Brock and Hudson Freeze of Indiana University reported a new species of  thermophilic bacteria which they named Thermus aquaticus. The bacterium was first isolated from Mushroom Spring in the Lower Geyser Basin of Yellowstone National Park, which is near the major  Great Fountain Geyser and White Dome Geyser, and has since been found in similar thermal habitats around the world.

Biology
T. aquaticus shows best growth at 65–70 °C (149–158 °F), but can survive at temperatures of 50–80 °C (122–176 °F). It primarily scavenges for protein from its environment as is evidenced by the large number of extracellular and intracellular proteases and peptidases as well as transport proteins for amino acids and oligopeptides across its cell membrane. This bacterium is a chemotroph—it performs chemosynthesis to obtain food. However, since its range of temperature overlaps somewhat with that of the photosynthetic cyanobacteria that share its ideal environment, it is sometimes found living jointly with its neighbors, obtaining energy for growth from their photosynthesis. T. aquaticus normally respires aerobically but one of its strains, Thermus aquaticus Y51MC23, is able to be grown anaerobically.

The genetic material of T. aquaticus consists of one chromosome and four plasmids, and its complete genome sequencing revealed CRISPR genes at numerous loci.

Morphology
Thermus aquaticus is generally of cylindrical shape with a diameter of 0.5 μm to 0.8 μm. The shorter rod shape has a length of 5 μm to 10 μm. The longer filament shape has a length that varies greatly and in some cases exceeds 200 μm. T. aquaticus has shown multiple possible morphologies in different cultures. The rod-shaped bacteria have a tendency to aggregate. Associations of several individuals can lead to the formation of spherical bodies 10 μm to 20 μm in diameter, also called rotund bodies. These bodies are not composed of cell envelope or outer membrane components as previously thought, but are instead made from remodelled peptidoglycan cell wall. Their exact function in the survival of T. aquaticus remains unknown but has been theorised to include temporary food and nucleotide storage, or they may play a role in the attachment and organisation of colonies.

Enzymes from T. aquaticus
T. aquaticus has become famous as a source of thermostable enzymes, particularly the Taq DNA polymerase, as described below.

Aldolase
Studies of this extreme thermophilic bacterium that could be grown in cell culture was initially centered on attempts to understand how enzymes, which are normally inactive at high temperature, can function at high temperature in thermophiles. In 1970, Freeze and Brock published an article describing a thermostable aldolase enzyme from T. aquaticus.

RNA polymerase
The first polymerase enzyme isolated from T. aquaticus in 1974 was a DNA-dependent RNA polymerase, used in the process of transcription.

Taq I restriction enzyme

Most molecular biologists probably became aware of T. aquaticus in the late 1970s or early 1980s because of the isolation of useful restriction endonucleases from this organism. Use of the term Taq to refer to Thermus aquaticus arose at this time from the convention of giving restriction enzymes short names, such as Sal and Hin, derived from the genus and species of the source organisms.

DNA polymerase ("Taq pol")

DNA polymerase was first isolated from T. aquaticus in 1976. The first advantage found for this thermostable (temperature optimum 72°C, does not denature even in 95 °C) DNA polymerase was that it could be isolated in a purer form (free of other enzyme contaminants) than could the DNA polymerase from other sources. Later, Kary Mullis and other investigators at Cetus Corporation discovered this enzyme could be used in the polymerase chain reaction (PCR) process for amplifying short segments of DNA, eliminating the need to add E. coli polymerase enzymes after every cycle of thermal denaturation of the DNA. The enzyme was also cloned, sequenced, modified (to produce the shorter 'Stoffel fragment'), and produced in large quantities for commercial sale. In 1989 Science magazine named Taq polymerase as its first "Molecule of the Year". In 1993, Mullis was awarded the Nobel Prize in Chemistry for his work with PCR.

Other enzymes
The high optimum temperature for T. aquaticus allows researchers to study reactions under conditions for which other enzymes lose activity. Other enzymes isolated from this organism include DNA ligase, alkaline phosphatase, NADH oxidase, isocitrate dehydrogenase, amylomaltase, and fructose 1,6-disphosphate-dependent L-lactate dehydrogenase.

Controversy
The commercial use of enzymes from T. aquaticus has not been without controversy. After Brock's studies, samples of the organism were deposited in the American Type Culture Collection, a public repository. Other scientists, including those at Cetus, obtained it from there. As the commercial potential of Taq polymerase became apparent in the 1990s, the National Park Service labeled its use as the "Great Taq Rip-off".  Researchers working in National Parks are now required to sign "benefits sharing" agreements that would send a portion of later profits back to the Park Service.

See also
 Biotechnology
 Geyser
 Thermophiles

References

Further reading

External links
Type strain of Thermus aquaticus at BacDive -  the Bacterial Diversity Metadatabase

Bacteria described in 1969
Deinococcota
Organisms living on hydrothermal vents
Polymerase chain reaction
Thermophiles
Thermozoa